Yongchon may refer to several places in Korea.  Because of North–South differences and various systems for the romanization of Korean, each of these place names has several possible English spellings.
Yeongcheon (영천시), also romanized as Yŏngch'ŏn, is a city in North Gyeongsang Province, South Korea
Ryongchon County (룡천군), also romanized as Ryongch'ŏn-kun, is a county in North Pyongan Province, North Korea.  The initial r is present in North Korean (but not South Korean) pronunciation and spelling.
Ryongch'ŏn-ri (룡천리) is a ri on the Ongjin Peninsula in Ongjin County, South Hwanghae, North Korea.  The initial r is present in North Korean (but not South Korean) pronunciation and spelling.